Thomas Kläy (born 28 June 1961) is a former Swiss curler. He played lead position on the Swiss rink that won a gold medal at the 1992 Winter Olympics when curling was a demonstration sport. He is also a two-time Swiss junior curling champion curler (1980, 1981).

Teams

Men's

References

External links

Living people
1961 births
Swiss male curlers

Curlers at the 1992 Winter Olympics
Olympic curlers of Switzerland

Place of birth missing (living people)
20th-century Swiss people